The Hawthorne Class Studio is a historic studio building off Miller Hill Road in Provincetown, Massachusetts. Its symmetrically arranged front has a center entry with narrow flanking windows, paired windows in bays on either side of the entrance, and single windows at the second level under the gable. The studio was constructed c. 1907 to house the teaching studio of artist Charles Hawthorne. Hawthorne began giving art classes in Provincetown in 1899, and was an acknowledged leader of the artistic community there at the time of his death in 1930.

The studio was listed on the National Register of Historic Places in 1978.

See also
National Register of Historic Places listings in Barnstable County, Massachusetts

References

External links
 MACRIS Listing - Hawthorne Class Studio

Buildings and structures on the National Register of Historic Places in Massachusetts
Buildings and structures in Barnstable County, Massachusetts
Provincetown, Massachusetts
National Register of Historic Places in Barnstable County, Massachusetts
Buildings and structures completed in 1907
Artists' studios in the United States